Hans-Dieter Karras (born 1 November 1959) is a German church musician, composer and organist.

Training 
Born in Jena, Karras began his organ studies with Karl Frotscher and Herbert Collum in Dresden. He then studied composition and orchestral conducting (with Manfred Weiss, Karl-Rudi Griesbach and Siegfried Kurz) at the Hochschule für Musik Carl Maria von Weber in Dresden. He supplemented his studies with master classes in Paris with Gaston Litaize, Odile Pierre, Jean Guillou and Jean Langlais.

Ecclesiastical offices 
 1982–2001 Kantor and organist at the Brüdernkirche St. Ulrici in Braunschweig

Concert activity 
Karras has given concerts in most European countries, Russia, North and South America, West Africa and Oceania. As a pianist and organist he also works as a chamber music and song accompanist. His compositions have been published by Prospect, Darcey Press and Edition Sonox, CD recordings with Karras have been released by the labels Prospect and Sicus Klassik.

Compositions 
 Sonata da chiesa per flauto e organo
 Concerto in fine tempore for flute and string orchestra
 Symphony Nr. 1 for soprano solo, timpani and string orchestra
 Symphony Nr. 2 Dresdner for organ, piano and large orchestra
 Symphony Nr. 3 Bilder aus Honduras for large orchestra
 Symphony Nr. 4 Sinfonia concertante for piano and chamber orchestra
 Symphony Nr. 5 Das Lied von den Engeln für Soli, Chor und großes Orchester
 Symphony Nr. 6 Sacra for four orchestral groups, Gregorian chorale choirs and organ
 String Quartet No. 1
 Concerto Brunsvigensis I for four transverse flutes or two transverse flutes and string orchestra
 Tryptique for organ or saxophone (also horn) and organ
 Sonata impressionistique for oboe (also flute or violin) and organ
 Concerto Brunsvigensis II
 Fantasia Argentina for violin solo
 Jesaja Cantata for soprano or tenor solo, choir and chamber orchestra
 Introit für Orgel
 Festival Evensong in C für Chor und Orgel
 Missa St. Laurentius for solos, choir and organ (orchestra)
 Partita Verleih uns Frieden gnädiglich for organ
 Partita Unser Herrscher for organ
 Partita Werde munter mein Gemüte for organ (it is the melody of J. S. Bach's Jesu, Joy of Man's Desiring)
 Partita Charlestown for organ (Amerikanisches Volkslied, 1799)
 Partita Nun komm, der Heiden Heiland for organ
 Partita Liebster Jesu, wir sind hier for organ

Discography 
 Theodore Dubois: Das gesamte Orgelwerk (five issues of planned seven on the Cavaillé-Coll-Organ of La Madeleine in Paris)
 Arthur William Foote: Das gesamte Orgelwerk (double-CD at the Aeolian-Skinner/Fritz-Noack-Orgel of the Episcopal Church of the Incarnation, Dallas, Texas)
 Highlights der Orgelmusik, Works in original and arrangements of Bach, Lang, Humperdinck, Karg-Elert, Elgar, Mozart, Wagner, Albinoni, Vierne, Archer and Widor
 Große Orgelwerke von Bach, Grigny, Renner und Guilmant aus der Brüdernkirche Braunschweig
 Joseph Jongen: Symphonie concertante op. 81 für Orgel und Orchester
 Weihnachtliche Orgelmusik der Romantik – Volume 1: Deutschland, Werke von Reger, Weidenhagen, Herzogenberg, Liszt, Laurischkus, Führer, Adler, Kraft und Merkel
 Orgelmusik von Acht bis Mitternacht: Live-Konzertmitschnitte der Reihe in Braunschweigs Brüdernkirche 1990–1999
 Ave Maria im Spiegel der Zeiten: 33 Ave Maria settings from five centuries ; Ingeborg Hischer (mezzo-soprano), Hans-Dieter Karras (organ); 2 CDs SICUS Klassik
 Arien und Kantaten des Barock by Vivaldi, J. S. Bach, J. Chr. Bach, Händel; Ingeborg Hischer (mezzo-soprano), Hans-Dieter Karras (organ), Concertino Braunschweig; CD SICUS Klassik
 Suiten für Orgel aus vier Jahrhunderten, Volume 1: Works by Froberger, Clérambault, Bach, Boëllmann, de Séverac, Young; CD SICUS Klassik

References

External links 
 
 Homepage von Hans-Dieter Karras
 
 Hans-Dieter Karras on Youtube

20th-century classical composers
20th-century German composers
20th-century hymnwriters
Classical organists
1959 births
Living people
Musicians from Jena